Lee Chia-hsin (born 14 May 1997) is a Taiwanese badminton player. She won her first international title at the 2013 Polish International in the women's doubles event partnered with Wu Ti-jung. Lee was the gold medalists at the 2017 Summer Universiade in the mixed doubles and team events.

Achievements

Summer Universiade 
Mixed doubles

Youth Olympic Games 
Mixed doubles

BWF World Junior Championships 
Girls' doubles

BWF World Tour (2 titles) 
The BWF World Tour, which was announced on 19 March 2017 and implemented in 2018, is a series of elite badminton tournaments sanctioned by the Badminton World Federation (BWF). The BWF World Tours are divided into levels of World Tour Finals, Super 1000, Super 750, Super 500, Super 300 (part of the HSBC World Tour), and the BWF Tour Super 100.

Mixed doubles

BWF Grand Prix (1 runner-up) 
The BWF Grand Prix had two levels, the Grand Prix and Grand Prix Gold. It was a series of badminton tournaments sanctioned by the Badminton World Federation (BWF) and played between 2007 and 2017.

Mixed doubles

  BWF Grand Prix Gold tournament
  BWF Grand Prix tournament

BWF International Challenge/Series (13 titles, 1 runner-up) 
Women's singles

Women's doubles

Mixed doubles

  BWF International Challenge tournament
  BWF International Series tournament
  BWF Future Series tournament

References

External links 

 

1997 births
Living people
Sportspeople from Taipei
Taiwanese female badminton players
Badminton players at the 2010 Summer Youth Olympics
Badminton players at the 2014 Summer Youth Olympics
Badminton players at the 2018 Asian Games
Asian Games competitors for Chinese Taipei
Universiade gold medalists for Chinese Taipei
Universiade medalists in badminton
Medalists at the 2017 Summer Universiade
21st-century Taiwanese women